= Carbon 1 MK II =

The Carbon 1 MK II is a smartphone designed by Carbon Mobile.

It is a 4G dual SIM phone. Additional connectivity includes Wi-Fi 5, Bluetooth 5.0 with aptX HD, NFC, GPS/GLONASS/Galileo and a USB-C 3.1 port.

== Reception ==
The Carbon 1 MK II received generally positive response. Pocketnow called it a "just 125 grams, but that’s about it", praising the new design reminiscent of the smartphone.
